Mark Irwin (born 1950) is a Canadian cinematographer.

Mark Irwin may also refer to:

Mark Irwin (poet), American poet
Mark Irwin (rugby union) (1935–2018), New Zealand rugby union player
Mark Irwin (songwriter), American country music songwriter